The Firearms Act, 1995, is the law in Canada that regulates firearms possession, means of transportation, and offenses. It was passed after the École Polytechnique massacre.

See also
 Firearms (Amendment) (No. 2) Act 1997 
 Arms Act 1983 
 Possession and Acquisition Licence

References

External links
 Firearms Act
 Prohibited firearms definition RCMP

Canadian firearms law
1995 in Canadian law
Canadian federal legislation